Mogullapalle is a village and a mandal in Jayashankar Bhupalpally district in the Indian state of Telangana.

Geography

Mogulapalli is a mandal in Jayashankar Bhupalapalli district in Telangana. Villages include Rangapuram, Isspeta, Motlapalli, Mulakalapalli, Korikshala and Chinthalapalli ganeshpally peddakomatipally parlapally

Economy 
Shops include supermarkets, bike showroom and SBI bank.

References 

Villages in Jayashankar Bhupalpally district
Mandals in Jayashankar Bhupalpally district